Hardships! is an album by Jenny Wilson, released in 2009.

Track listing
"The Path" – 5:19
"Like a Fading Rainbow" – 3:47
"Clattering Hooves" – 4:43
"The Wooden Chair" – 3:15
"Porcelain Castle" – 3:36
"Anchor Made of Gold" – 4:48
"Bad Waters" – 4:29
"Only Here for the Fight" – 4:55
"Pass Me the Salt" – 3:19
"Motherhood" – 1:06
"Hardships" – 4:24
"We Had Everything" – 5:32
"Strings of Grass" – 4:37

Charts

References

2009 albums
Jenny Wilson (singer) albums
European Border Breakers Award-winning albums